Cide District is a district of the Kastamonu Province of Turkey. Its seat is the town of Cide. Its area is 652 km2, and its population is 22,136 (2021).

Composition
There is one municipality in Cide District:
 Cide

There are 75 villages in Cide District:

 Abdülkadir
 Ağaçbükü
 Akbayır
 Akça
 Alayazı
 Alayüz
 Aydıncık
 Baltacı
 Başköy
 Beltepe
 Beşevler
 Çakırlı
 Çamaltı
 Çamdibi
 Çataloluk
 Çayüstü
 Çayyaka
 Çilekçe
 Çukurçal
 Denizkonak
 Derebağ
 Derebucağı
 Doğankaya
 Döngelce
 Düzköy
 Emirler
 Gökçeler
 Gökçeören
 Gündoğan
 Günebakan
 Güzelyayla
 Hacıahmet
 Hamitli
 Himmetbeşe
 İlyasbey
 İsaköy
 İshakça
 Kapısuyu
 Karakadı
 Kayaardı		
 Kazanlı
 Kethüda
 Kezağzı
 Kıranlıkoz
 Koçlar
 Konuklar
 Köseli
 Kovanören
 Kumköy
 Kuşçu
 Kuşkayası
 Mencekli
 Menük
 Musaköy
 Nanepınarı
 Okçular
 Olucak
 Ortaca
 Ovacık
 Öveçler
 Pehlivanlı
 Sakallı
 Şenköy
 Sırakaya
 Soğucak
 Toygarlı
 Üçağıl
 Uğurlu
 Velioğlu
 Yalçınköy
 Yaylaköy
 Yenice
 Yeniköy
 Yıldızalan
 Yurtbaşı

References

Districts of Kastamonu Province